Bäveån is a river in Sweden. It is nearby Skansberget, Brattåsholmen and Lövåsberget.

References

Rivers of Västra Götaland County